Rafael Jose Dolis Hernandez (born January 10, 1988) is a Dominican professional baseball pitcher for the Pericos de Puebla of the Mexican League. He has played in Major League Baseball (MLB) for the Chicago Cubs and Toronto Blue Jays, and in Nippon Professional Baseball (NPB) for the Hanshin Tigers.

Professional career

Chicago Cubs
He began his professional career in 2006 pitching for the AZL Cubs, going 0–2 with an 8.28 ERA in 13 games (three starts). In 25 innings of work, he struck out 33 batters. He pitched for the  Peoria Chiefs in 2007, going 3–1 with a 1.80 ERA in six starts. After not pitching in 2008, Dolis pitched for the Daytona Cubs in 2009, going 3–9 with a 3.79 ERA in 27 games (25 starts).

He began 2010 with the Daytona Cubs. He made the Chicago Cubs opening day roster in 2012, but was demoted to the Cubs' Triple-A Iowa Cubs in May 2012 after compiling an MLB record of 2–4 with an ERA of 4.73.

Dolis was outrighted off the Cubs roster on October 9, 2013.

San Francisco Giants
Dolis signed a minor league deal with the San Francisco Giants in December 2013. On May 26, 2014, Dolis was released by the Giants.

Detroit Tigers
On December 5, 2014, Dolis signed a minor league contract with the Detroit Tigers. He elected free agency on November 6, 2015. During the 2015 season, Dolis pitched in 43 games out of the bullpen and posted a 7–5 record with one save, a 4.61 ERA and 54 strikeouts for the Triple-A Toledo Mud Hens.

On December 8, 2015, Dolis re-signed with the Tigers on a minor league contract with an invite to spring training. However, he was released on January 15 to pursue a contract with the Hanshin Tigers.

Hanshin Tigers
On January 18, 2016, Dolis signed with the Hanshin Tigers of Nippon Professional Baseball (NPB).

In 2016, Dolis pitched 34 innings of 2.12 ERA ball for the Tigers. On December 2, 2016, he became a free agent.

On February 22, 2017, Dolis re-signed with the Tigers. In 2017, Dolis pitched 63 innings for the Tigers with a 2.71 ERA. After the season, on December 11, 2017, he re-signed with the Tigers with Marcos Mateo.

In 2018, Dolis pitched to a 2.85 ERA in 53 innings. On December 2, 2018, he became a free agent. On December 12, 2018, he re-signed with the Tigers.

In 2019, his last year with the Tigers, he had a 2.11 ERA in 55 innings of work. In his four years with the Tigers, Dolis had a 13–18 record, 2.49 ERA, 96 saves, and 227 strikeouts in 206 innings. On December 2, 2019, he became a free agent.

Toronto Blue Jays
On February 8, 2020, Dolis signed a one-year, $1 million contract with the Toronto Blue Jays. His contract includes a club option for the 2021 season.

On July 24, 2020, Dolis made his Blue Jays debut and on August 19, 2020, he recorded his first MLB save since 2012. With the 2020 Toronto Blue Jays, Dolis appeared in 24 games, compiling a 2–2 record with 1.50 ERA and 31 strikeouts in 24.0 innings pitched. In 32 appearances for the Blue Jays in 2021, Dolis posted a 2–3 record with a 5.63 ERA and 39 strikeouts. On August 18, 2021, Dolis was designated for assignment by the Blue Jays. On August 20, Dolis cleared waivers and was assigned outright to the Triple-A Buffalo Bisons. On October 4, Dolis elected free agency.

Chicago White Sox
On April 29, 2022, Dolis signed a minor league deal with the Chicago White Sox organization. He was released on September 8, 2022.

Pericos de Puebla
On January 13, 2023, Dolis signed with the Pericos de Puebla of the Mexican League.

References

External links

1988 births
Living people
Arizona League Cubs players
Buffalo Bisons (minor league) players
Chicago Cubs players
Daytona Cubs players
Dominican Republic expatriate baseball players in Japan
Dominican Republic expatriate baseball players in the United States
Estrellas Orientales players
Fresno Grizzlies players
Hanshin Tigers players
Iowa Cubs players
Kane County Cougars players
Major League Baseball pitchers
Major League Baseball players from the Dominican Republic
Nippon Professional Baseball pitchers
Peoria Chiefs players
Tennessee Smokies players
Toledo Mud Hens players
Toronto Blue Jays players